Nikolas William "Nik" Ledgerwood (born 16 January 1985) is a Canadian soccer coach and former player who serves as an assistant coach with Cavalry FC.

Club career

Early career
Born in Lethbridge, Alberta, Ledgerwood played for Calgary Storm in 2002, before signing with 1860 Munich in 2003. He signed a two-year (plus two-year club option) contract with 1860 Munich of the German Second Bundesliga in July 2003. He had a few seasons with them in their 'B' team, who played in Germany's third level. In 2006, he joined their senior team but he only became a regular after a loan period at second level Wacker Burghausen, who got themselves relegated at the end of the 2006–07 season.

FSV Frankfurt
After five years with Munich, on 9 June 2009 he announced his move to FSV Frankfurt on a one-year contract.

Wehen Wiesbaden
On 12 July 2010, Ledgerwood signed a two-year contract with SV Wehen Wiesbaden.

Hammarby IF
In the summer of 2012, it was announced that Ledgerwood had signed for Hammarby in the Superettan. He made his debut on 4 August 2012 in a 1–0 victory over Umeå. Three weeks later on 26 August, Ledgerwood scored his first goal for the club against Falkenbergs FF, the game ended in an away 3–1 win.

FC Edmonton
On 12 January 2016 it was announced that Ledgerwood had signed a deal with FC Edmonton in the North American Soccer League. Ledgerwood played in the 3–0 loss on 11 May 2016 and the 2–0 win on 18 May 2016 against the Ottawa Fury in the Canadian Championship. Ledgerwood would spend two seasons with FC Edmonton, before the club ceased operations after the 2017 season.

Calgary Foothills
In January 2018, Ledgerwood would sign with Premier Development League club Calgary Foothills FC, serving as both the captain of the club for the 2018 season, and as an academy coach. When interviewed about the decision, Ledgerwood indicated the signing was with an eye on the launch of the Canadian Premier League in 2019, as well as his post playing career. Calgary would go on to win the PDL Championship that season.

Cavalry FC
In November 2018, Ledgerwood was unveiled alongside Sergio Camargo as Cavalry FC's first signings ahead of the inaugural Canadian Premier League season. He scored three goals in eighteen league appearances for Cavalry that season on route to two split season titles and a run to the semi-finals of the Canadian Championship. On 13 November 2019, Ledgerwood re-signed with Cavalry for the 2020 season. In January 2022, Ledgerwood would announce his retirement from playing.

International career

Youth
Ledgerwood was a member of the Canada U-17 team at the 2001 CONCACAF U-17 Tournament.

Was injured during the Youth Team camp before the 2003 CONCACAF U-20 Tournament.  He played one game for Canada at the 2003 FIFA U-20 World Cup. He played in two Youth Team friendlies against the United States in December 2004. He played against Jamaica in two friendlies in July 2004. He played in all three games (Mexico, Honduras, Jamaica) at the 2005 CONCACAF U-20 Tournament in January 2005. He played 90 minutes against Panama on 4 January 2005, and 90 minutes against Ecuador on 6 January 2005. He played 90 minutes in all three games (Syria, Colombia, Italy) at the 2005 FIFA U-20 World Cup in the Netherlands.

Senior
He made his senior debut for the Canada men's national soccer team on 22 August 2007 against Iceland. He has represented Canada in qualification for the 2010, 2014 and 2018 FIFA World Cups. Ledgerwood scored his first goal for Canada against El Salvador on 6 September 2016.

Coaching career
In 2017 Ledgerwood earned his Canada Soccer Coaching B License. He later earned his Canadian A License. On 15 February 2022, after retiring as a player, Ledgerwood rejoined Cavalry FC as an assistant coach and community relations manager.

Career statistics

Club

1.Includes the NASL playoffs.

International

Scores and results list Canada's goal tally first, score column indicates score after each Ledgerwood goal.

Honours

Club
MSV Duisburg
Lower Rhine Cup: 2014

Energie Cottbus
Brandenburg Cup: 2015

Calgary Foothills
PDL Championship: 2018

Calvary FC 
 Canadian Premier League Finals 
Runners-up: 2019
Canadian Premier League (Regular season): 
Champions: Spring 2019, Fall 2019

References

External links

1985 births
Living people
Association football midfielders
Canadian soccer players
Soccer people from Alberta
Sportspeople from Lethbridge
Canadian expatriate soccer players
Expatriate footballers in Germany
Canadian expatriate sportspeople in Germany
Expatriate footballers in Sweden
Canadian expatriate sportspeople in Sweden
Calgary Storm players
TSV 1860 Munich II players
TSV 1860 Munich players
SV Wacker Burghausen players
FSV Frankfurt players
SV Wehen Wiesbaden players
Hammarby Fotboll players
MSV Duisburg players
FC Energie Cottbus players
FC Edmonton players
Calgary Foothills FC players
Cavalry FC players
A-League (1995–2004) players
Oberliga (football) players
Regionalliga players
2. Bundesliga players
3. Liga players
Superettan players
North American Soccer League players
USL League Two players
Canadian Premier League players
Canada men's youth international soccer players
Canada men's under-23 international soccer players
Canada men's international soccer players
2007 CONCACAF Gold Cup players
2011 CONCACAF Gold Cup players
2013 CONCACAF Gold Cup players
2015 CONCACAF Gold Cup players
Canadian soccer coaches
Cavalry FC non-playing staff